Mrs. GREEN APPLE (stylized in all caps;) is a three-member Japanese rock band from Tokyo that made its major debut in 2015 with EMI Records.
They are known for performing the ending theme to the anime series Yu-Gi-Oh! Arc-V as well as their first full album, Twelve, which placed 10th on the Japanese national Oricon charts. Their song "Inferno" is used as the opening theme for the first season of the anime Fire Force.

History

2013 
Singer Ohmori started creating music when he was in 6th grade, but did not form a band till 2013. Mrs. GREEN APPLE was formed in the spring of 2013 with 4 members: Ohmori, Wakai, Yamanaka, and a former member who was a bassist. Later, Ohmori invited Fujisawa, and Mrs. GREEN APPLE became a 5-member band.

2014 
On February 4, the band released their demo CD, 1st Demo, at concert venues where they played. The demo included two songs, "リスキーゲーム (Risky Game)" and "恋と吟(うた) (Koi to Uta)." Just a few months later, their first mini album, Introduction, was released at the band's first self-planned event. The gig, held on July 5 at Shibuya LUSH, sold out and was also the place where the former bassist announced that he would leave the band.

2015 
2015 marked a huge change for Mrs. GREEN APPLE. On February 18, the band released their first nationally distributed CD, Progressive. A month later, on March 26, they announced that they would debut from a major label at their third self-planned event, which also sold out. The group's mini album Variety, was released by EMI Records on July 8. That summer, the group went on to perform at some of the most popular music festivals in Japan, such as Rock in Japan Festival, Rising Sun Rock Festival, and Rush Ball. In December, the group released their first single, "Speaking." The song was chosen as the ending theme song for the anime Yu-Gi-Oh! Arc-V.

2016 
Mrs. GREEN APPLE released their first full album, Twelve, on January 13, and made many appearances on television. The group went on their first national one-band tour from March 1 to April 10 of the same year.

2017–2019

2020 – hiatus 
Following the success of their first ever arena tour, the band announced that they will be releasing a Best Album compilation called "5". The album consisted of remastered tracks from their previous albums, as well as three new songs. It was released worldwide on July 8, 2020, together with the music video for the song "Theater."

Shortly after the release of "5", the band announced the "End of Phase 1", as well as the deactivation of the individual Twitter accounts of each members. The band also published a blog post regarding their end of activities:

Today, as of July 8, 2020, Mrs. GREEN APPLE announces "the end of Phase 1", and also that the band takes a break for the time being.

That does not mean a negative hiatus but we begin preparations for our new step to the next Phase.

At the same time, Mrs. GREEN APPLE is now independent from the ex-management company. 

The End of Phase 1 also marked the announcement and start of "Project-MGA", in which the band will be hiring creators and project crew members to join them for their Phase 2.

2021 – Motoki Ohmori's solo career; Phase One group split
On February 18, 2021, the band announced that vocalist Motoki Ohmori is making his debut as a solo artist.
 His debut digital EP, "French", was released on February 24 (JST).
Later, on December 29, 2021, it was announced that two members of Phase 1 of Mrs. Green Apple, founding member and drummer Ayaka Yamanaka and bassist Kiyokazu Takano would be leaving the group, with Fujisawa, Wakai, and Ohmori remaining in the group for Phase 2, set to begin in 2022. A day later, on December 30, it was specified via YouTube video that MGA would officially return Spring 2022.

Band members
Current members
  — vocals, guitar (2013–present)
  — guitar (2013–present)
  — keyboards (2013–present)

Former members
  — bass guitar (2013–2014)
  — drums (2013–2021)
  — bass guitar (2014–2021)

Discography

Albums

Studio albums

Mini albums

Singles

Festivals and Events
 Minami Wheel 2014
 Live DI:GA Judgement 2014
 Music Monsters -2015 winter-
 Mihoudai 2015
 Rock in Japan Festival 2015
 Rising Sun Rock Festival 2015
 Rush Ball 2015
 Sweet Love Shower 2015
 Minami Wheel 2015
 Countdown Japan 15/16
 Japan Jam 2016

References

External links 
 
 

2013 establishments in Japan
Musical groups from Tokyo
Japanese rock music groups
EMI Records artists
Musical groups established in 2013
Musical groups disestablished in 2020
Musical groups reestablished in 2022
Musical quintets